Maripa may refer to:
 Maripa, Venezuela
 Maripa (grasshopper), a genus of grasshoppers in the family Eumastacidae
 Maripa (plant), a genus of plants in the family Convolvulaceae 
 The Maripa palm, (Attalea maripa)

or to:
 Maripá, Paraná, Brazil
 Maripá de Minas, Minas Gerais, Brazil